Liga Indonesia Third Division (Indonesian: Divisi Tiga Liga Indonesia) is the fifth level football league in Indonesian football competition system. Currently, this competition, along with First Division and Second Division, is managed by the Amateur League Board of the Football Association of Indonesia (PSSI).

2010–11 Liga Indonesia Third Division is the six season of Liga Indonesia Third Division

Third round

Qualify teams
All qualify teams after 7 December 2010.

 Sumatra Zone (4 teams Promotions) in Thamrin Graha Metropolitan Complex, Medan Helvetia
Persip Pasee (Aceh)
Persijaya Aceh Jaya (Aceh)
Bintang Jaya Asahan (North Sumatra)
Thamrin Graha Metropolitan (North Sumatra)
PSKB Bukittinggi (West Sumatra)
Persepak Payakumbuh (West Sumatra)
 Java Zone (4 teams Promotions)
Perssi Sukabumi (West Java)
Maung Bandung FC (West Java)
Persekabpur Purworejo (Central Java)
Tunas Jogja (Yogyakarta)
Persatu Tuban (East Java)
PSIL Lumajang (East Java)
Mitra Bola Utama Sidoarjo (East Java)
Gresik Putra (East Java)
 Kalimantan Zone (2 teams Promotions) in Tuah Pahoe Stadium, Palangkaraya
PS PU Putra (Central Kalimantan)
Persekat Katingan (Central Kalimantan)
Martapura FC (Central Kalimantan)
Persekap Kapuas (Central Kalimantan)
 Sulawesi Zone (2 teams Promotions) in Lakidende Stadium, Kendari
Persibolmut North Bolaang Mongondow (North Sulawesi)
Persikokot Kotamobagu (North Sulawesi)
PS Dafi Mulia South Konawe Regency (South East Sulawesi)
PS Kendari (South East Sulawesi)
 Lesser Sunda Islands Zone (2 teams Promotions)
Perseden Denpasar (Bali)
PSK Kupang (East Nusa Tenggara)
 Maluku & Papua Zona (2 teams Promotions)
Nusaina FC (Maluku)
Persipuja Puncak Jaya (Papua)
Persimap Mappi (Papua)
Persindug Nduga (Papua)

Table and results

Sumatra Zone
Thamrin Graha Metropolitan Complex, Medan Helvetia

Java Zone
Group XX :

Group XXI : Lokajaya Stadium, Tuban or WR Supratman Stadium, Purworejo

Kalimantan Zone
Tuah Pahoe Stadium, Palangkaraya

Sulawesi Zone
Lakidende Stadium, Kendari

Maluku & Papua Zone
Group XXIV : Manado

Fourth stage 

All participants this round of automatic promotion to the 2011-12 Liga Indonesia Second Division.

Qualify teams

Knockout stage
Participate is 4 grub winner from fourth stage.

Qualify teams
TGM Medan (North Sumatra)
Persibolmut (North Sulawesi)
ISP Purworejo (Central Java)
MBU Sidoarjo (East Java)

Knockout phase

Semi finals

Final

Champions

Notes

External links
 Website of the PSSI's Board for Amateur Leagues

2010-11
5